Dar Chenar may refer to:
Dar Chenar, Jiroft
Dar Chenar, Kuhbanan